First Baptist Church is a historic Baptist church in the historic district of Wilmington, North Carolina. The church is part of the Cooperative Baptist Fellowship.

History 

The church was founded in 1808.

Gallery

References 

Churches completed in 1839
Churches in Wilmington, North Carolina
Baptist churches in North Carolina